"Twisted" is a song by Australian band Vandalism, and the second single from their debut album Turn the World On.

Track listing
Australian CD single
 "Twisted" (Original Mix – Edit)
 "Twisted" (Club Mix)
 "Twisted" (TV Rock Mix)
 "Never Say Never" (The Hard Rub)
 "Twisted" (Kam Denny's Freakshow Dub)
 "Twisted" (Pitch Black mix)

Charts

Release history

References

Vandalism (band) songs
2006 singles
2006 songs
Capitol Records singles